O'Callaghan's Mills GAA is a Gaelic Athletic Association club based in O'Callaghan's Mills, County Clare, Ireland. The club fields teams in both hurling and Gaelic football.

Major honours
 Clare Senior Hurling Championship (8): 1904, 1906, 1909, 1910, 1918, 1923 (as Kilkishen), 1932 (as Kilkishen), 1937
 Clare Intermediate Hurling Championship (5): 1929 (as Kilkishen), 1933, 1935 (as Kilkishen), 1968, 1977
 Clare Junior A Hurling Championship (1): 2020
 Clare Junior A Football Championship (1): 2007

Notable players
 Patrick Donnellan
 Pa "Fowler" McInerney
 Tom McInerney
 P. J. O'Connell
 Conor Cooney

External links
Feakle GAA on Facebook

Gaelic games clubs in County Clare
Hurling clubs in County Clare